Itaborahia is a fossil genus of medium-sized air-breathing land snails, terrestrial pulmonate gastropods in the family Bulimulidae. The genus is known only from the Brazilian Paleocene deposits of the Itaboraí Basin, in the state of Rio de Janeiro.

Species 
The only species currently in this genus is Itaborahia lamegoi Maury, 1935, although some other species were previously included within this genus.

References 

Bulimulidae
Paleocene gastropods